The Web of Desire is a lost 1917 silent film drama directed by Emile Chautard and starring Ethel Clayton. It was produced by Peerless Studios and distributed through World Pictures.

Cast
Ethel Clayton - Grace Miller
Rockliffe Fellowes - John Miller
Doris Field - Mrs. Langley
Edward M. Kimball - Thomas Hurd
Madge Evans - Marjorie
William A. Williams - Robert Elwell

References

External links
The Web of Desire at IMDb.com

1917 films
Lost American films
Films directed by Emile Chautard
1917 drama films
American silent feature films
American black-and-white films
Silent American drama films
Films shot at Peerless Studios
World Film Company films
1917 lost films
Lost drama films
1910s American films